Malini Agarwal (born 26 May 1977), a.k.a. MissMalini, is an Indian digital influencer, TV host, entrepreneur and best-selling author. Formerly a radio jockey on Mumbai's Radio One (India) and Head of Digital Content for Channel V India, she founded her blog MissMalini.com in 2008, covering gossip and current events in Bollywood, Indian television, fashion, beauty and lifestyle. Aside from radio and her blog, she has also guest anchored several television shows, including CNN-IBN's Tech Toyz and UTV Bindass' Style Police, as well as two seasons of her own show, MissMalini's World on TLC and Inside Access with MissMalini on vh1.

Early life
Malini was born on 26 May 1977, in Allahabad, India. She grew up in various countries as her parents worked with the Indian foreign service, eventually graduating from Maitreyi College, Delhi University and moving to Mumbai, where she now lives.

Awards and recognition 
Malini has received much recognition over the years, with many celebrated accolades under her belt. She ranked #1 on IMPACT's 50 Most Influential Women in Media, Marketing and Advertising 2017, and has been recognized as one of the top business leaders to watch on Fortune India's 40 Under 40 List, GQ's 50 Most Influential Young Indians List and World Marketing Congress's 50 Most Influential Digital Marketing Leaders Listing. She has been awarded Cosmopolitan's Editors' Choice Awareness Influencer of the year 2020 along with being named one of the Top 10 Young Businesswomen by CNBC-TV18 at the Young Turks Summit and the #1 Digital Influencer in the world on SERMO's Digital Influencer Index 2016. She was also a part of YourStory's 100 Digital Influencers of 2020.

Radio
Agarwal started her radio career as a Radio Jockey with WIN 94.6 in Mumbai, which later became Go 92.5 and then Radio One 94.3. Some of the shows she hosted included Horn OK Please, 225, Tiger Time with Malini, Overdrive and Malini till Midnight.  Agarwal worked her way up to Programming Director before she decided to transition to digital TV, becoming Channel V India's Head of Digital Content. Although she no longer hosts her own show, Agarwal continues to be a regular contributor to radio shows, including a weekly call-in with the BBC Asia Network.

MissMalini.com
MissMalini.com was founded as a hobby blog in 2008, as an extension to the gossip column Agarwal had been writing on the side for many years, with Mumbai tabloid Mid-Day. Following a surge in readership, she decided to leave Channel V to focus full-time on the blog. The blog draws inspiration from international sites such as PerezHilton and PopSugar covering all aspects of Bollywood and celebrity life. It also covers the latest in Indian and international fashion trends, along with lifestyle content such as Travel, Food, and Nightlife. MissMalini.com is also the official blogging partner for fashion properties in India like Lakme Fashion Week, Blender's Pride Fashion Tour, and India Resort Fashion Week. The blog has also covered fashion events outside of India, most recently Cape Town Fashion Week 2012.

Agarwal is also related with her show "Inside access with Miss Malini" where she meets several celebrities and does fun stuff together. Season 1 has finished airing, with season 2 in progress.

Agarwal and her blog missmalini.com are regularly featured in leading digital and print fashion and lifestyle publications, including Elle, Cosmopolitan, Harper's Bazaar, Grazia, Femina (India), and Glamrs.com among others. In December 2021, the company was acquired MyGlamm for an undisclosed amount.

Other works
Agarwal is the author of the book To The Moon: How I Blogged My Way To Bollywood.

References

External links
 Malini Agarwal on Forbes

1977 births
Living people
Indian bloggers
Indian women bloggers
Writers from Allahabad
People from Allahabad
Indian DJs
Delhi University alumni